Taking Earth is a 2016 South African low-budget science fiction film directed by Grant Humphreys, written by Grant Humphreys, Grant Knight and Michael Harrison. It was released in Japan on 3 March 2017 and US on 17 March 2017. It also came out on iTunes on 2 May 2017 and Netflix on 31 July 2017. Screenmedia in USA used Youtube (Popcornflix) as another distribution arm and the film has received over 5 Million views. The film was sold worldwide by the High Octane Media - Sales agent, and distributed in multiple territories.

Logline 

An unexplained attack happens when concealed aliens invade earth to find one person out of 7 billion , who can save the fate of the planet.

About the film 

Taking Earth is a Sci Fi film produced in South Africa by Digital Forces, the 3MT (Three Man Team). Grant Humphreys is the Director, born to tell stories and bring his creative talent to life.

The film is based in reality and is a character story where we have focused the storyline around the arcs of the main cast. Firstly the humans on earth are thrown into torment as they do not understand the events unfolding. As families are broken and survival becomes a priority, people begin to bond with strangers as friendships form and leaders begin to show. Fear of the unknown, but the desire for survival drive the population to friendship and compassion.

The invaders have a hierarchy of order and the control of the mission is under the Supreme leader (Devanera's) son (Garabon). Garabon is a fearless General whose mission is to secure the boy, however as he infiltrates our world, he is affected by our humanity and experiences emotion he is unfamiliar with. His cousin Irehkull has ulterior motives to succeed Devanera as the new leader, as he secretly plots to remove Garabon from the line of succession.

The film was produced in South Africa by Digital Forces, the 3MT, and everything was sourced at Digital Forces. From conceptualization to final product, the only areas that were outsourced were: Final Mix Sound (Red Pepper Studios), Score (Josh Cruddas / Canada) and color grade (Flying Circus). Apart from that, the 3MT handled every aspect of the project from Script, through production, into post and special effects to final delivery, as well as composing the character main tunes that were then  incorporated as themes into the main score by Josh Cruddas.

Taking Earth is a journey through the emotions and values of humanity as the characters face the conflicts thrust upon them. The aliens that have come in search of the boy have a real motivation for invading our world, as desperate times call for desperate measures.

The producers wrote Taking Earth with the intention of building a larger universe. There are currently 2 sequels planned.

Cast
Ronan Quarmby as David, Cameron's friend
Brad Richards as  Garabon/Graeme, an invading alien disguised as a human, tasked in finding Cameron

The Brad Richards blue hyperlink is connected to a hockey player and not this actor. Please fix.

Barbara Harrison as Ellen, Cameron's protector who is an alien disguised as a human
Marco Torlage as Cameron, an alien disguised as a human who been hiding on Earth for the past 7 years 
Dick Sorenson as Devanera, Neran leader, Garabon's father and Irehkull's uncle 
Annabelle Van Heerden as Sarah, David's girlfriend
Tyla Goodwin as Shanna, young lady who was rescued by Cameron and David

Reception
Filmtv gave the film, a 3.3/10 Letterboxd gave the film, a 2.8/5, Moria gave the film, a 2 1/2/5, Nerdly said "Taking Earth is a soft recommend", Sensecritique gave the film, a 2.7/10.

Taking Earth was pirated before release and this hugely affected the film's success. After a rocky start, Taking Earth received some very good traction and received a much more favourable response, with many sincere reviewers requesting a sequel.

Released in 
Japan

Korea

Middle East

Italy

China

Ukraine

USA / Canada

UK

Taiwan

France

Scandinavia

India

Germany

Popular Reviews

Tabuno - Utah

IMDb 15 August 2017 
Aliens invade the entire earth to look for one boy. There is a point in the early part of the movie where human skepticism about the existence of aliens takes place. Unlike, almost every other scene in other science fiction movies, the fascinating interaction that takes place here seems very captivating, almost for once, a really scripted-conversation of humans with suspended disbelief instead of the typical insanity response seen in every other movie. It's a refreshing experience. Also even Harry Potter movies don't come close to the same sense of serious danger that occurs in a silently standing still scene where the extended scene almost amazingly justifies the director's use of a questionable flashback at the beginning of the movie (a movie technique often abused). As a result, there is a wonderful sense of exhilaration that the movie evokes, a sense of wondrous realization of alien life in a way that does not dramatize, but emotes its universal essence of discovery that is likely within all of us, as one character says, "This is freakin' awesome."

The pleasant musical score is well executed and transforms with the chaotic bluster of fleeing refugees or the sweeping magnificence of a panoramic beauteous landscape in many ways resembling the epic martial arts movie like Yimou Zhang's Hero (2004) to accompanying scenes of quieter peacefulness revealing intimate interludes such as in John Schlesinger's Separate Tables (1983). The editing between set design and action, incorporating humor (from an unexpected source) and human drama is done in a well-executed fashion so the pacing and compelling interest is sustained throughout most of the movie. Additionally, the visual futuristic design when it is used is sleek, different, exciting, and visually pleasing too and, even if it is slightly fake, the totality of the images such as found in Fred Wilcox's Forbidden Planet (1956) can etch a memory sense forever.

Some would complain, perhaps rightly, about the various sudden editing chops and several disjointed scenes found in this movie. Yet for others, the rhythm and the overall editing of various disparate situations among different groups of people/aliens, may provide allowances for such jumps without destroying the flow of the movie itself.

There are simplified elements of political machinations as found in David Lynch's Dune (1984) with even faint suggestions of a more human version of the fantasy classic Rob Reiner's The Princess Bride (1987). Unlike the continuous sense of doom and ominous gloom along with a series of intense action scenes of The War of the Worlds (2005) which has similar themes as Taking Earth, Taking Earth is a more intimate and focused look at the humans involved in the story themselves interspersed with more captivating physical scenes. While the ending might be considered overly dumbed down and perhaps too saccharine, on the other hand, it seems to have both an edge to it as well as a powerful emotive blissfulness to it. Overall, this movie could be considered an excellent one for its originality and grounding to its more basic human/alien core.

Producer Note: We appreciate this review as there is no assumptions made on production of this film and the review has been focused primarily on themes without providing any spoilers. It has been reviewed by an experienced film viewer and Mr Tabuno has hit the nail on the head and highlighted many decisions that were deliberately made during the scripting and pre production phase. One of these points was the human / alien relation and discovery. Thank you for your review.

Vchuttursing - Mauritius

IMDb 9 August 2017 
Firstly it's a low budget taking that in consideration this is well made don't expect too much if you want quality and great effects go and watch high budgeted movies and stop hating this one.They even dare to adventure in this genre you people start spreading hatred give time they will get to perfect point if their beginning is partly good lets wait when they achieve the peak what would happen.From a fan of movies these director must keep on the good work.

Rotten Tomatoes 13 August 2017 
Beautifully done visual effects and cinematography is spewingly stunning.

Cinafilm 13 August 2017 
This was honestly a good movie! I don't see what people don't see in  awe and greatness. I want a sequel, it so good. It was and is one of the best movies I that have ever seen.

Radar2609 - Texas

IMDb 6 August 2017 
I thought the film was great! Locations, music, special effects, story-line even the cast. All have immersed themselves in their characters. Sure there are no Nichole Kidmans or Halley Barry's. No Matthew Mcconaheys or Brad Pitts. But they acted and they did it as well as they could. When the cast get more formal training, they could be as good as the stars listed above. Brad Pitt's first movie was not as good as the last one he did! Further, just because actors don't talk the same way we do, doesn't mean they're any less talented or dedicated than "our" actors are. Think about that, please before lambasting an otherwise good to great film!

Scratchmb - Canada

IMDb 4 August 2017 
The major thing I believe that most people do not take into consideration is that this film is out of South Africa, and we really do not see a whole lot of science fiction/fantasy genre from this country, so with all due respect for international film makers, this is for the sake of American viewers is a foreign film.

Since I have a fondness for diverse foreign film making, I have to take such perspectives into considerations. Face it, a lot of American film watchers are not particularly fond of Australian films, and I fail to see why. They often have some of the best scores, soundtracks, and cinematography in the industry. They are just not accustom to their cultural spin on things and their unique sense of humor.

I found Taking Earth quite bold and a remarkable change considering what has come out of the South Africa film industry before. It was well played out, told its story, and provided an entertainment value.

References

External links

  BBFC website
Taking Earth

2017 films
2010s science fiction films
Films set in South Africa
Films shot in South Africa
2010s English-language films